The 2008 United States Senate special election in Wyoming took place on November 4, 2008, at the same time as the regular election to the United States Senate in Wyoming. The special election occurred to complete the term of Republican incumbent Craig L. Thomas, who won reelection in 2006, but died in June 2007. Despite being a Democrat, Governor Dave Freudenthal was obliged by state law to appoint a Republican, and selected state senator John Barrasso. Barrasso was unopposed in the Republican primary, and went on to win the general election to fill the remainder of the term until January 3, 2013.

Background 
Wyoming law dictates that when a U.S. Senate seat becomes vacant, the departing senator's state party at the time of the most recent election must create a list of three finalists, with the governor to select one of those candidates to fill the seat. Speculation about potential Republican challengers had included the other finalists to succeed Thomas, Cynthia Lummis and Tom Sansonetti; as well as former state House Speaker Randall Luthi, and former U.S. Attorney Matt Mead.

Democratic primary

Candidates 
 Nick Carter, attorney
 Keith Goodenough, Casper city councilman and former Wyoming State Senator

Results

Republican primary

Candidates 
 John Barrasso, incumbent U.S. Senator

Results

General election

Candidates 
 John Barrasso (R), incumbent U.S. Senator
 Nick Carter (D), attorney

Predictions

Polling

Results

See also 
 2008 United States Senate elections

References

External links 
 Elections from the Wyoming Secretary of State
 U.S. Congress candidates for Wyoming at Project Vote Smart
 2008 Wyoming Senate race from CQ Politics
 Wyoming U.S. Senate - Class I Class II from OurCampaigns.com
 Campaign contributions for Wyoming congressional races from OpenSecrets
 Official campaign websites
 John Barrasso, Republican incumbent candidate (Class I)
 Nick Carter Democratic candidate (Class I)

Wyoming 2008
Wyoming 2008
2008 Special
Wyoming Special
United States Senate Special
United States Senate 2008